Jean Plannette (1905-1966) was an American screenwriter and writer active during the 1920s and 1930s. She was briefly married to RKO technician Edward L. Cox; the pair had a daughter, Elizabeth, before divorcing.

Selected filmography 

 The Little Maestro (1937)
 Bars and Stripes (1937)
 Annie Laurie (1936)
 Whispering Winds (1929)
 Comrades (1928)
 Outcast Souls (1928)
 Polly of the Movies (1927)
 Ragtime (1927)

References 

American women screenwriters
Screenwriters from Michigan
1905 births
1966 deaths
20th-century American women writers
20th-century American screenwriters